Sovremenny was the lead ship of s of the Soviet and later Russian navy.

Development and design 

The project began in the late 1960s when it was becoming obvious to the Soviet Navy that naval guns still had an important role particularly in support of amphibious landings, but existing gun cruisers and destroyers were showing their age. A new design was started, employing a new 130 mm automatic gun turret.

Construction and career 
Sovremenny was laid down on 3 March 1976 and launched on 18 November 1978 by Zhdanov Shipyard in Leningrad.  She was commissioned on 25 December 1980.

During a friendly visit to the port of Split, Yugoslavia, she damaged her port propeller

By June 4, 1985, on returning to Severomorsk, she had sailed 19,985 nautical miles.

During the competitive artillery fire of the ships of the KUG of the 56th destroyer brigade of the 7th operational squadron, which was held on October 9, 1986, she won the Navy Main Committee Prize for artillery training as part of the KUG.

On December 15, 1988, Sovremenny was put into the 2nd category reserve.

On May 25, 1989, she was delivered for repair and modernization to the shipyard No. 35 (Rosta), however, due to insufficient funding, the modernization was extremely slow.

As a result, after 1991 it was decided to exclude the ship from the lists of the fleet, which happened on November 15, 1998, on the same day the naval flag was lowered on the ship.

The technical readiness of the destroyer on August 1, 1997 was 72% and by the time of decommissioning at 86%. Disassembled in Murmansk in 2003.

Gallery

References

Bibliography

1978 ships
Ships built at Severnaya Verf
Cold War destroyers of the Soviet Union
Sovremenny-class destroyers